For Wives Only is a 1926 American silent comedy film directed by Victor Heerman and starring Marie Prevost, Victor Varconi and Charles K. Gerrard.

Cast
 Marie Prevost as Laura Rittenhaus 
 Victor Varconi as Dr. Rittenhaus 
 Charles K. Gerrard as Dr. Carl Tanzer 
 Arthur Hoyt as Dr. Fritz Schwerman 
 Claude Gillingwater as Professor von Waldstein 
 Josephine Crowell as Housekeeper 
 Dorothy Cumming as Countess von Nessa 
 William Courtright as Butler

References

Bibliography
 Munden, Kenneth White. The American Film Institute Catalog of Motion Pictures Produced in the United States, Part 1. University of California Press, 1997.

External links
 

1926 films
1920s English-language films
American silent feature films
Silent American comedy films
Films directed by Victor Heerman
American black-and-white films
Producers Distributing Corporation films
1926 comedy films
1920s American films